NGS may refer to:

Places
 NGSO (NGS orbit), non-geostationary orbit
 Nagasaki Airport (IATA airport code: NGS) in Omura, Nagasaki, Japan

Organisations
 National Galleries of Scotland, representing the national art collection of Scotland
 National Garden Scheme, British organisation which promotes the opening of private gardens for charity
 National Genealogical Society, United States non-profit organization in the field of family history research 
 National Geodetic Survey, United States service operating under the control of the National Oceanic and Atmospheric Administration
 National Geographic Society, United States scientific and educational institution
 National Grammar School, Lahore, Pakistan
 National Gramophonic Society, for the recording and publication of classical music
 National Grid Service, UK academic computing grid
 Newcastle Grammar School, New South Wales, Newcastle, Australia
 NGS Secure, UK-based security company
 Nortel Government Solutions, US-based IT services company
 NordicGreenSolutions, carbon emission compensation company

Military
 Naval General Service Medal (disambiguation) (NGS medal)
 Naval General Service Medal (1847) awarded for various naval actions during the period 1793–1840
 Naval General Service Medal (1915) awarded for various naval actions from 1915 to 1962
 Naval Gunfire Support, the practice of firing at land based targets from offshore

Other
 NASDAQ Global Select Market, see NASDAQ#Market tiers
 Neutral grain spirit, or pure grain alcohol 
 Next-generation sequencing, a type of DNA sequencing
 Ninja Gaiden Sigma, a video game
 Nitrogen Generation System, found in aircraft to reduce fire risk in fuel tanks, a type of inerting system

See also

NG (disambiguation)
NSG (disambiguation)
SNG (disambiguation)
SGN (disambiguation)
GNS (disambiguation)
GSN (disambiguation)